Jean-Baptiste Raymond de Lacrosse (Meilhan, 6 September 1760 – Meilhan, 10 September 1829) was a French sailor, admiral and hero of the French Revolutionary Wars.

Career
Lacrosse joined the Navy in 1779 as a Garde marine. He rose to enseign in 1782, to lieutenant in 1786, and to capitaine de vaisseau in 1792. He was military governor of Saint Lucia in 1792 to 1793.

In 1795, he was sent to Martinique and Guadeloupe to crush revolts. On his return to France, Lacrosse was arrested.

Freed, he was attached to the planned invasion of Ireland in late 1796, commanding the 74-gun Droits de l'Homme. The invasion failed, and on her journey back, the Droits de l'Homme fought the action of 13 January 1797 against two British frigates, the Indefatigable under Sir Edward Pellew and the Amazon. Lacrosse was wounded and his ship was lost when she ran aground.

Despite the loss of his ship, Lacrosse was made contre-amiral. In 1799, he was sent as ambassador to Spain and notably negotiated the forcible return of émigréssl to France. He was offered the Ministry of Marine, which he declined.

In 1802, First Consul Napoleon Bonaparte made him general captain of Guadeloupe. On 1 November 1801, Lacrosse was captured by rebels, as he was leading a reconnaissance out of Pointe-à-Pitre. Pelage, the leader of the rebels, brought him aboard a Danish ship. Lacrosse set out for Dominica, where he joined the expedition led by General Antoine Richepanse, and returned with it to Guadeloupe. When Richepanse died, Lacrosse took command and managed to crush the rebellion and to restore slavery.

In Guadeloupe, Lacrosse sent the military to track down farmers, who were treated as rebels and summarily killed.

Lacrosse sailed back to France aboard the frigate Didon. He did not know that the Peace of Amiens had ended and that hostilities had resumed with the British. Off Brest, he ran into twelve British ships of the line blockading the port. He managed to evade the blockading fleet and captured the corvette Laurier in the process. He reached Spain, left his prize in Santander and returned to France.

Napoléon made him préfet maritime and gave him command of the flotilla intended to ferry troops for an invasion of England. Lacrosse was made commander of the Légion d'Honneur at the founding of the Order. When Admiral Bruix died in 1805, Lacrosse succeeded him as commander-in-chief of the navy.

Lacrosse retired in 1815 and died in his hometown of Meilhan on 10 September 1829.

See also
List of colonial governors and administrators of Saint Lucia

References

 

French Navy admirals
1760 births
1829 deaths
French naval commanders of the Napoleonic Wars
Republicanism in Saint Lucia
Governors of French Saint Lucia